Denis Eugene Hurley (9 November 1915 – 13 February 2004) was the South African Roman Catholic Vicar Apostolic of Natal and Bishop, and later Archbishop of Durban, from 1946 until 1992. He was born in Cape Town and spent his early years on Robben Island, where his father was the lighthouse keeper. In 1951, Hurley was appointed Archbishop of Durban and the youngest archbishop in the world at that time.

Hurley was an active participant in the Second Vatican Council, which he described as "the greatest project of adult education ever held in the world".

An outspoken opponent of apartheid, as chairman of the Southern African Catholic Bishops' Conference, Hurley drafted the first of the ground-breaking pastoral letters in which the bishops denounced apartheid as "blasphemy" and "intrinsically evil." Upon his retirement as archbishop, he served as the Chancellor of the University of Natal.

Life
Denis Hurley was born in Cape Town to Irish parents, spending his early years on Robben Island, where his father was the lighthouse keeper. Educated at St Charles College in Pietermaritzburg, Natal, he joined the Missionary Oblates of Mary Immaculate (OMI) in 1931 and in the following year was sent to Ireland for his novitiate.

In 1933, Hurley was sent to the Angelicum University (now known as Pontifical University of Saint Thomas Aquinas) in Rome to study philosophy and theology. He received the degree Licentiate of Philosophy from the Angelicum in 1936 and started studying at the Gregorian University.

Hurley was ordained as a priest in Rome on 9 July 1939 and was awarded his license in Theology in 1940. Later he was appointed curate at Emmanuel Cathedral, Durban, where he stayed until 1943 when he was appointed Superior at Saint Joseph's Scholasticate, then based in Prestbury, Pietermaritzburg. He stayed in this position until 12 December 1946 when, aged 31, was named Vicar Apostolic of Natal and Bishop of Durban. He was the youngest Roman Catholic bishop in the world at that time.
He chose as his motto Ubi Spiritus, ibi libertas, which means "Where the Spirit is, there is liberty". Hurley was among the first church leaders to denounce apartheid, condemning the policy as an affront to human dignity.

On 11 January 1951, the Vicariate Apostolic of Natal was elevated to the Archdiocese of Durban and Hurley became archbishop, also the youngest in the world at the time.

In the following year, Hurley became the first president of the newly established Southern African Catholic Bishops Conference, a post he held until 1961. He was again President of this body from 1981 until 1987. Hurley is remembered for his contribution to the struggle against apartheid, his concern for the poor and his commitment towards a more just and peaceful society. In 1961, he was appointed to the Central Preparatory Commission for the Second Vatican Council.

Second Vatican Council
In 1961, Hurley was appointed to the Central Preparatory Commission for the Second Vatican Council. He attributed this to Rome having out-of-date information stating he was still President of the Southern African Bishops Conference, when in fact Archbishop Owen McCann was President. At the council itself, Hurley was elected to the Commission for Seminaries, Studies and Catholic Education. During the council, he gave ten speeches and made four written submissions.

During the council, Hurley wrote a series of anonymous articles for the South African Catholic weekly newspaper "The Southern Cross". In 2001 he wrote a 17-part series of memories of Vatican II for The Southern Cross.  In recounting its informal cycle of lectures, workshops and long evenings of debates over dinner with interested members of the clergy and laity, Hurley   observed that the presence of so many scholars who had been called to Rome to assist with the work of Vatican II had created "the greatest project of adult education ever held in the world." These articles provided the basis for his posthumously published memoirs of the Council, Keeping the Dream Alive.

Hurley was described as "...an eloquent and forceful preacher, ...mild-mannered and soft-spoken away from the pulpit. He was a man of formidable intellect, so much so that he was held in awe by his clergy.

ICEL
Hurley took a special interest in the active participation of all the baptized in the church’s liturgy, especially the Mass. In 1975, Hurley was elected chair of the International Commission on English in the Liturgy (ICEL), a post to which he was re-elected until 1991. His work with Msgr. Frederick McManus of Catholic University in Washington led to a plan that a number of English speaking conferences would join together to prepare a single text for proposed use all over the world. In 1965 Pope Paul VI named Hurley to the Consilium for the Implementation of the Constitution on the Sacred Liturgy. In 1975 as ICEL chairman, he oversaw the completion of the four-volume breviary. Hurley frequently registered his disappointment at the reorganisation of ICEL under the auspices of the newly established Vatican office Vox Clara, as mandated by Pope John Paul II's instruction Liturgiam authenticam.

Social justice
According to Anthony Egan, "Prohibited during Dutch rule, coolly tolerated by the British, and treated with intense suspicion after the Union of South Africa in 1910, the Church was (unsurprisingly) cautious in challenging apartheid. With the majority of its clergy foreign-born and thus vulnerable to deportation, it was encouraged even by the Vatican to ‘play it safe’ after the 1948 National Party election victory. But Hurley, a white South African by birth, ... thought differently."
Hurley was an outspoken opponent of apartheid, and was a driving force in a 1957 declaration by the bishops of South Africa that described apartheid as "intrinsically evil". In the late 1970s Hurley held a daily silent protest, standing in front of the central Durban Post Office for a period each day with a placard expressing his opposition to apartheid and the displacement of people from their homes. In 1984 Hurley was charged with contravening the South African police act by publishing information which the government alleged to be untrue about atrocities committed in Namibia by the South African military unit known as Koevoet. He received many death threats and was at times subject to house arrest. On three occasions bombs went off near his residence. The state withdrew the charges later and settled a claim by the Archbishop for damages out of court, paying him R 25,000. Due to his commitment to social justice, the Denis Hurley Peace Institute, an associate body of the Southern African Catholic Bishops Conference, was named in his honour. Hurley also worked to assist young men who for reasons of conscience were opposed to joining the South African military.

The Hurley Case
A lawsuit, known as The Hurley Case, managed to secure the release of Paddy Kearney, a political opponent of the ruling National Party detained under Section 29 of the Internal Security Act. According to South African law professor Tony Mathews, the case "Hurley and Another vs the Minister of Law and Order" became "the most important civil rights ruling for several decades" and is still taught in law schools today. Hurley became actively involved, turning up in black communities the day they were due to be forcibly removed. On hearing that children had died shortly after one such removal, Hurley counted their graves and recorded their names and ages. Then he released the details to the press, much to the fury of the state. In response to the weak response of South Africa's churches to apartheid, Hurley founded an ecumenical agency, Diakonia, dedicated to social justice. Hurley said his greatest struggle was convincing South African Roman Catholics that social justice was integral to their faith rather than an optional extra.
Hurley was nicknamed Mehl'emamba (Eyes of the Mamba) by appreciative Zulus.

Thomas More College
Hurley played a key role in supporting Chris Hurley (his brother) and Robin Savory in founding Thomas More College. His brother Chris later became the second headmaster of the school. Archbishop Hurley also wrote the school song, "God Our Maker". There is a memorial garden dedicated to him located on the school grounds.

Last years
On retiring as Archbishop of Durban in 1992, Hurley became chancellor of the University of Natal from 1993 to 1998. He also served as a parish priest for ten years at Emmanuel Cathedral, Durban, where he had officiated so many years earlier as a curate.

Hurley was seen by some as a "liberal". Many believe that his respectful and very careful questioning of Humanae Vitae in 1968 made the cardinalate an impossibility.

In 2002 Hurley retired to write his memoirs. He also spent his time writing letters to The Times debating the finer points of cricket, and composing the words for new hymns. The final article to be published in his lifetime was a guest editorial in the Christmas 2003 edition of "The Southern Cross", headlined "God's special gift to us". Hurley died as he was being driven back to the Oblate retirement community in Durban after a celebration of the 50th anniversary of a school at whose dedication he had presided as a young archbishop.

Honours
Hurley received the following honours during his lifetime:

Legacy
According to Gerald Shaw writing for The Guardian, "It was in part due to his sustained moral crusade and that of other churchmen that the transition to democracy, when it came in 1994, was accepted by white people in peace and good order."

The Archdiocese of Durban Archbishop Denis Hurley Memorial Fund was set up in favor of two favorite projects of Archbishop Hurley: Kwa Thintwa School for the Deaf and San Egidio Community Project in Mozambique. There is a bronze statue of Archbishop Hurley at the Kwa Thintwa School, KZN commissioned by the Premier of KwaZulu-Natal, Dr Zweli Mkhize.

The Denis Hurley Association of is a UK registered charity established in London "to promote and raise funds for the Denis Hurley Centre in Durban, South Africa". The Centre is planned as home to about a dozen projects to provide medical care, a soup kitchen, job training, support for people living with HIV/AIDS and in particular will offer assistance to refugees, migrants, who have reached South Africa from afar afield as Somalia, Zimbabwe and the Democratic Republic of Congo.

References

Sources
Denis O.P, P., Facing the Crisis Selected Texts of Archbishop D.E. Hurley (Cluster Publications, 1997).  
Gamley, A. Denis Hurley A Portrait by Friends  (Cluster Publications, 2001). 
Kearney, P Memories: The memoirs of Archbishop Denis E Hurley OMI (Cluster Publications, 2006).

External links
 Catholic Agency for Overseas Development (CAFOD) obituary for Archbishop Hurley
 "Hurley bio: A full life of love", The Southern Cross
 "Archbishop Hurley: A great man's 50 years", The Southern Cross
 National Catholic Reporter obituary
 Vatican Council II reminiscences by Archbishop Hurley
The Daily Telegraph (UK) obituary
The Independent (UK)obituary
Honouring the Burly Hurley by Stephen Coan, The Witness, August 17, 2009
 Archbishop Hurley always took a stand for peace and justice, Bishop Rubin Phillip, Daily News, 24 April 2012

20th-century Roman Catholic archbishops in South Africa
1915 births
2004 deaths
Roman Catholic anti-apartheid activists
White South African anti-apartheid activists
Missionary Oblates of Mary Immaculate
Participants in the Second Vatican Council
People from Cape Town
People from Durban
South African people of Irish descent
20th-century Roman Catholic bishops in South Africa
Servants of God
21st-century venerated Christians
Roman Catholic bishops of Umzimkulu
Roman Catholic bishops of Durban
Roman Catholic archbishops of Durban